Elizabeth Gertrude Stern (Feb 14, 1889 – Jan 9, 1954) was an American author, journalist, and essayist. She also wrote under the pen names Leah Morton, Eleanor Morton, and E. G. Stern.

Education

Elizabeth Gertrude Stern earned her B.A. from the University of Pittsburgh in 1911.

Family life

In 1911 Elizabeth Gertrude Stern married penologist, Leon Thomas Stern (1887–1980). They worked closely together, and co-authored the book "A Friend in Court" published in 1923 by the Macmillan Company. They had two sons, Thomas Leon Stern born in 1913, and Richard LeFevre, born in 1921. She died in Philadelphia in January 1954 at the age of 64. She was survived by her husband, Leon, who lived until 1980.

Quotations
"I remember looking down at the face of my father, beautiful and still in death, and for a brief, terrible moment feeling my heart rise up--surely it was in a strange, suffocating relief?--as the realization came to me: "Now I am free!" All my life, for 29 years, he had stood like an image of fine-carved stone, immovable, unbending, demanding that I submit my will and my thought, my every act in life, to the creed he represented. His creed was that of Judaism, brought to the 20th century from the 15th, and held with an intensity and a passionate faith that would destroy everything in his life, the very happiness of his children, that it might not be, in one small observance, unhonored." --"I am a Woman and a Jew" by Elizabeth Gertrude Stern (pseud. Leah Morton) 1926 

“I ardently believe in pretending. I council the young – and the old as well—not to say frankly what they are. I believe, deeply, in having all the pleasant make-believe we can build about ourselves. And I believe this because I know the imaginary person any of us presents must be a shield before oneself. The pretended image we offer is a mask put up naively in front of our faces—as old mimes in Greek plays held their masks of tragedy and comedy, beauty and splendor and shame, quite candidly before their faces, spectators looking on. The audience knew the player undertook his part and the mask fitted the part and that was all that was asked.” --"Not All Laughter" by Elizabeth Gertrude Stern (pseud. Eleanor Morton) 1937

Foreword by Theodore Roosevelt

In 1916 Elizabeth Gertrude Stern's Essay, "My Mother and I," was published in the Ladies' Home Journal. The piece includes a foreword by President Theodore Roosevelt.

"Sagamore Hill.--
This is a really note-worthy story-- a profoundly touching story-- of the Americanization of a young girl, who between babyhood and young womanhood leaps over a space which in all cultural and humanizing essentials is far more important than the distance painfully traversed by her fore-fathers during the preceding thousand years. When we tend to grow disheartened over some of the developments of our American civilization, it is well worth while seeing what this same civilization holds for starved and eager souls who have elsewhere been denied what here we hold to be, as a matter of course, rights free to all-- although we do not, as we should do, make these rights accessible to all who are willing with resolute earnestness to strive for them. I must cordially commend this story."—Theodore Roosevelt.

In Aviva F. Taubenfeld's book, "Rough Writing: Ethnic Authorship in Theodore Roosevelt’s America," Taubenfeld questions why a relatively unknown author such as Stern should receive such a strong recommendation from the president. Taubenfeld suggests that Roosevelt may have championed Stern's story as part of an ongoing campaign to advance his own ideological goals via popular media. Taubenfeld writes "Roosevelt's patronage of Elizabeth Stern's story provides a crucial link between his simultaneous desires to remake the American woman and home and to Americanize the foreigner".

In popular culture
Elizabeth Gertrude Stern is a character in Eve Merriam's play, "Out of Our Father's House," based on Merriam's book "Growing Up Female in America". The play takes place in the 1910s and features six women, "a schoolgirl-- founder of the Women's Suffrage Movement, an astronomer, a labor organizer, a minister, a doctor and a woman from the Jewish ghetto." The play was televised as PBS's Great Performances: "Out of Our Father's House", in 1978, with the role of Elizabeth Gertrude Stern played by actress Dianne Wiest.

Works

My Mother and I (with foreword by Theodore Roosevelt) (1917) Full Text On-line
A Friend at Court, with L.T. Stern (1923)
I Am a Woman—and a Jew (1926; reprint 1969, 1986)
 This Ecstasy (1927)
 A Marriage Was Made (1928)
 When Love Comes to Woman (1929)
 Gambler’s Wife (1931)
 Not All Laughter: A Mirror to Our Times (1937)
 Memories: The Life of Margaret McAvoy Scott (1943)
 Josiah White: Prince of Pioneers (1947)
 The Women Behind Gandhi (1953)

References

External links 
Jewish Women's Archive
My Jewish Learning
Writing Our Lives: Autobiographies of American Jews, 1890-1990  edited by Steven Joel Rubin
"Growing Up Female in America: Ten Lives" edited by Eve Merriam
"Rough Writing: Ethnic Authorship in Theodore Roosevelt's America" by Aviva F. Taubenfeld
"Out of Our Father's House" a play based on Eve Merriam's "Growing Up Female in America"
"How We Found America: Reading Gender Through East-European Immigrant Narratives" by Magdalena J. Zaborowska
Artist Statement by Jessica Broad, Great-granddaughter of Elizabeth Gertrude Stern
University of Pittsburgh Students
"Imaginary Jews: Elizabeth Stern's Autobiographic as Amnesia" essay by Laura Browder
"Secret Family" by T. Noel Stern
 

Jewish women writers
Jewish American writers
20th-century American memoirists
1889 births
1954 deaths
American women memoirists
20th-century American women